Cushing is a city in Woodbury County, Iowa, United States. It is part of the Sioux City, IA–NE–SD Metropolitan Statistical Area. The population was 230 at the time of the 2020 census.

History
A post office called Cushing has been in operation since 1883. The city was named for L. Cushing Kimball, brother of a railroad official.

Geography
Cushing is located at  (42.465087, -95.676336).

Demographics

2010 census
As of the census of 2010, there were 220 people, 99 households, and 58 families living in the city. The racial makeup of the city was 99.5% White and 0.5% from two or more races. Hispanic or Latino of any race were 2.7% of the population.

There were 99 households, of which 24.2% had children under the age of 18 living with them, 53.5% were married couples living together, 1.0% had a female householder with no husband present, 4.0% had a male householder with no wife present, and 41.4% were non-families. 36.4% of all households were made up of individuals, and 17.1% had someone living alone who was 65 years of age or older. The average household size was 2.22 and the average family size was 2.98.

The median age in the city was 42.5 years. 25.5% of residents were under the age of 18; 5.3% were between the ages of 18 and 24; 21.9% were from 25 to 44; 26.8% were from 45 to 64; and 20.5% were 65 years of age or older. The gender makeup of the city was 52.7% male and 47.3% female.

2000 census
As of the census of 2000, there were 246 people, 104 households, and 66 families living in the city. The racial makeup of the city was 100.00% White. Hispanic or Latino of any race were 0.41% of the population.

There were 104 households, out of which 31.7% had children under the age of 18 living with them, 55.8% were married couples living together, 4.8% had a female householder with no husband present, and 36.5% were non-families. 32.7% of all households were made up of individuals, and 23.1% had someone living alone who was 65 years of age or older. The average household size was 2.37 and the average family size was 2.98.

In the city, the population was spread out, with 26.8% under the age of 18, 5.7% from 18 to 24, 26.8% from 25 to 44, 19.9% from 45 to 64, and 20.7% who were 65 years of age or older. The median age was 40 years. For every 100 females, there were 87.8 males. For every 100 females age 18 and over, there were 87.5 males.

The median income for a household in the city was $37,500, and the median income for a family was $47,000. Males had a median income of $29,844 versus $21,719 for females. The per capita income for the city was $18,408. About 2.9% of families and 6.7% of the population were below the poverty line, including 5.5% of those under the age of eighteen and 10.0% of those 65 or over.

Education
The River Valley Community School District operates public schools serving the community. It was established on July 1, 1996 by the merger of the Eastwood Community School District and the Willow Community School District. The Eastwood school district itself was formed on July 1, 1966 by the merger of the Correctionville and Cushing school districts.

Notable person
Kelly Goodburn, punter in the NFL

References

Cities in Woodbury County, Iowa
Cities in Iowa
Sioux City metropolitan area